Alex Bolt was the defending champion, but he did not participate this year.

Franko Škugor won the title, defeating Gavin van Peperzeel in the final, 7–5, 6–2.

Seeds

Draw

Finals

Top half

Bottom half

References
 Main Draw
 Qualifying Draw

Anning Open - Singles
2015 Singles